The 2022 Singapore Cup was the 23rd edition of the Singapore Cup, Singapore's annual premier club football knock-out tournament organised by the Football Association of Singapore. 

Tampines Rovers were the defending champions, having won the tournament when it was last held in 2019. The cup had returned after a pandemic-enforced absence over the past two years. The draw was held on 27 September 2022.

Hougang United defeated defending champions Tampines Rovers 3–2 in the final to win their inaugural Singapore Cup.

Format

Competition
The 2022 Singapore Cup commenced on 27 October 2022 with a group phase of two groups with four teams each. The teams competed in a single-round group stage. The top two teams advanced to the semifinals with the group winners facing the runner-up team from the other group.

Groups

Group A

Group B

Semi-finals 
The first legs will be played on 11 November 2022, and the second legs will be played on 15 November 2022.

|}

Hougang United won 7–5 on aggregate.

Tampines won 9–1 on aggregate.

3rd / 4th

Final

Season statistics

Top scorers
As of 19 Nov 2022

Top assists
As of 19 Nov 2022

Clean sheets
As of 15 Nov 2022

Own goals
As of 31 Oct 2022

Yellow Cards (Players) 
As of 18 Nov 2022

Red Cards (Players)
As of 31 Oct 2022

Disciplinary (Team) 
As of 19 Nov 2022

Penalty missed

References

Singapore Cup seasons
Singapore
2022 in Singaporean football